TDA Armements SAS was a French defence company, that made widely deployed air-to-ground rockets (sub-metric precision rocket), and now a division of Thales Group.

History
Its rockets are, and have been, mostly carried by attack helicopters and ground attack aircraft. The modern company was set up in December 1994 as a joint venture of EADS Deutschland and Thales.

In October 2005, Thales Land & Joint Systems bought 100% of the company by buying the 50% share of EADS.

Structure
It is headquartered in La Ferté-Saint-Aubin, in the Loiret department in the Centre-Val de Loire region.

It exports around a half of its products.

Products

 Detonation systems
 Equipment for the Crotale (missile), MICA (missile), AS-30 and Aster (missile family)
 SNEB 68mm air to ground rocket system, commonly carried by the Harrier throughout its life

See also
 List of military rockets
 List of missiles of the RAF
 Matra

References

External links
 Rocket systems

1994 establishments in France
Air-to-ground rockets
Companies based in Centre-Val de Loire
Manufacturing companies established in 1994
Thales Group divisions and subsidiaries